The Siyal Islands are a group of islands off the coast of northeastern Africa, located in the Red Sea. The islands are located in the Halaib Triangle, which is claimed by both Sudan and Egypt, as part of an ongoing border dispute. Since the 1990s, the islands have been occupied by Egypt, and so the islands are de facto administered by Egypt. They remain, however, to be claimed by Sudan.

The islands are part of the Elba Protected Area of Egypt, and are home to the white-eyed gull, with an estimated seventy individuals at the maximum, as well as several ospreys. The islands are surrounded by rocks and coral, and have a sandy surface with scant marine vegetation. The local fishermen, descendants of the Huteimi peoples identified by J. R. Wellsted, harvest turtle and bird eggs from the surrounding area.

References

Islands of Egypt
Islands of the Red Sea
Islands of Africa